In cryptography, rotational cryptanalysis is a generic cryptanalytic attack against algorithms that rely on three operations: modular addition, rotation and XOR — ARX for short. Algorithms relying on these operations are popular because they are relatively cheap in both hardware and software and run in constant time, making them safe from timing attacks in common implementations.

The basic idea of rotational cryptanalysis is that both the bit rotation and XOR operations preserve correlations between bit-rotated pairs  of inputs, and that addition of bit-rotated inputs also partially preserves bit rotation correlations. Rotational pairs of inputs can thus be used to "see through" the cipher's cascaded ARX operations to a greater degree than might be expected. This ability to "see" correlations through rounds of processing can then be exploited to break the cipher in a way that is similar to differential cryptanalysis.

The term "rotational cryptanalysis" was coined by Dmitry Khovratovich and Ivica Nikolić
in 2010 paper "Rotational Cryptanalysis of ARX", which presented the best cryptanalytic attacks at that time against a reduced-round Threefish cipher — part of the Skein hash function, a SHA-3 competition candidate. A follow-up attack from the same authors and Christian Rechberger breaks collision resistance of up to 53 of 72 rounds in Skein-256, and 57 of 72 rounds in Skein-512. It also affects the Threefish cipher.

References 

Cryptographic attacks